The Zwarte Cross Festival is the largest paid festival in the Netherlands, and the largest motor event in the world. The 19th edition in 2015 had 197,450 visitors and the 20th edition in 2016 numbered 220,000 visitors. The festival is a combination of motorcross, music, theatre and stunts.
'Zwarte Cross' literally means 'black cross'; it is a reference to the illegal motocross races in the 1960s.

History

The first edition of the Zwarte Cross took place in 1997. It was a motorcross in which anyone could compete on a motorcycle, moped or scooter. About 150 people competed, and there were 1000 visitors. The day was concluded with a concert of the organizing rock band, Jovink en de Voederbietels. Although the name suggested the race was illegal, the organisation had all the needed permits.

The festival proved to be successful, and the second edition had 350 competitors, and 4000 visitors, but a lot of people got injured. Therefore, the organisation decided to cooperate with a professional motorcross-club, HALMAC in Halle. The third edition was held on their official Grand Prix circuit.

In 2007, the festival moved to Lichtenvoorde.

The mascot and logo of the Zwarte Cross is 'Tante Rikie', Rikie Nijman, the mother of Jovink's manager, André Nijman. She is the unofficial festival CEO and is well-known by the visitors. During the festival, she is carried around in a sedan chair, and visitors kneel for her.

Editions

2010
The 14th edition took place 15 July - 18 July. Performing bands were: Airbourne, Band Zonder Banaan, The Baseballs, Big Shampoo and the Hairstylers, Black Spiders, Caro Emerald, Coparck, DeWolff, Di-rect, Jon Oliva's Pain, Guus Meeuwis, Kamelot, K's Choice, Mala Vita, Marike Jager, Moss. 148,000 people visited the festival.

On 12 July, only a few days before the festival, a storm hit the festival-terrain. 4 people were injured. All of the already built tents were blown over, some destroyed. The damage was over 1 million euro. The scenery of the mega-tent (the biggest on the terrain, was replaced by an outdoor-stage.
Saturday 17 July, an employee of a fairground attraction was killed in an accident, while testing the ride.

2011
The 15th edition had 152,500 visitors. Some of the bands performing were: Blondie, Anthrax, Disabuse, Ilse de Lange, Jacqueline Govaert, Life of Agony, Miss Montreal, The Black Crowes, Helloween, Sepultura, Vanderbuyst, De Staat, Go Back to the Zoo and Annihilator. About 150 bands played on 20 stages.

2012
The 16th edition took place from 20 July - 22 July. The registration for competitors was closed in a record time, within ten minutes. Some of the bands were: Kaiser Chiefs, Within Temptation, DeWolff and Direct.

2020-2021
Editions 2020 and 2021 were not held because of the Covid pandemic.

2022
The 2022 edition was held from 15 to 17 July. Main acts at this 24th edition were Dropkick Murphys, Kensington, Claw Boys Claw and Katchafire.

References

Festivals in the Netherlands
Summer events in the Netherlands
Festivals established in 1997
1997 establishments in the Netherlands
Music in Oost Gelre
Achterhoek